The All Mon Region Democracy Party (AMRDP) was a political party in Myanmar, representing the interests of the Mon people. In the 2010 Myanmar general election, which was boycotted by both the main opposition National League for Democracy and the other main Mon party, the Mon National Party, the AMRDP won 16 total seats, 3 in the Pyithu Hluttaw (the lower house), 4 in the Amyotha Hluttaw and 9 in regional hluttaws.

In 2013, there were reports that the party agreed to merge with the MNP. However, a party called the AMRDP contested the 2015 general election, where it won no seats in the national parliament and just one seat in the Mon State Hluttaw.

The party's former chairperson Nai Ngwe Thein died on 2 October 2018.

References

2010 establishments in Myanmar
Ethnic political parties
Mon State
Political parties established in 2010
Political parties in Myanmar